Mastic was a station stop along the Montauk Branch of the Long Island Rail Road. It was located on the corner of Mastic Road and Mastic Boulevard at the Mastic Road grade crossing, near the Fire Department and Mastic Seafoods.

History
Mastic station was originally built by the Brooklyn and Montauk Railroad as Forge Station around 1882, and renamed Mastic around 1893 following the renaming of the hamlet of Forge. It contained both a passenger and freight/express depot. When Brookhaven station was eliminated by the Long Island Rail Road on October 6, 1958, Mastic station was one of two stations recommended for use as a substitute by the patrons of the now-closed station. The other was Bellport station. However, this substitute was short-lived because Mastic station finally closed on July 7, 1960, as the new Mastic-Shirley station opened 7,010 feet west at the William Floyd Parkway grade crossing on the same date. The depot was razed in August 1960, despite efforts by local residents of Mastic, Mastic Acres, Mastic Beach and Mastic Park to keep it intact.

References

External links
Ken Spooner's Old Mastic Station Website
1959 LIRR Christmas Decoration Contest

Demolished railway stations in the United States
Former Long Island Rail Road stations in Suffolk County, New York
Railway stations in the United States opened in 1882
1882 establishments in New York (state)
Railway stations closed in 1960